Chamberlain Chinedu Ogunedo is an Anglican bishop in Nigeria.

He was ordained  a deacon in 1998 and a priest in 1999.  He became a Canon in  2002; and an archdeacon in  2008.  He has also been chaplain to the Bishop of Aba.

Ogunedo became Bishop of Mbaise on 28 February 2010.

Notes

Living people
Anglican bishops of Mbaise
21st-century Anglican bishops in Nigeria
Anglican archdeacons in Nigeria
Year of birth missing (living people)
Church of Nigeria archdeacons